The 1991 Soviet Top League season was 22nd in the Top League and the 54th since the establishment of nationwide club competition, also the last one. Dynamo Kyiv were the defending 13-times champions and came fifth this season. A total of sixteen teams participated in the league, twelve of them have contested in the 1990 season while the remaining four were promoted from the Soviet First League due to withdrawals. The representatives of the Baltic states as well as Georgia chose not to take part in the competition.

The season began on 10 March and lasted until 2 November 1991. The season was won by PFC CSKA Moscow that returned to the top league prior to the last season while winning the Soviet Cup competition as well. The season's culmination occurred in its final rounds, when the army team managed to overtake Spartak, while with four rounds left in the season, Spartak was leading the table a point ahead of CSKA and a recent thrashing of Dynamo Moscow 7 to 1.

Due to participants withdrawal in the preceding season four new teams entered the league. Upon the conclusion of the season no clubs were relegated and 12 out of its 16 participants formed a base for either the Russian or the Ukrainian competitions, while other four participants joined their own newly formed national leagues. If the Soviet Union had remained intact, Metalist Kharkiv and Lokomotiv Moscow would have been relegated to the Soviet First League for the next season, while FC Rotor Volgograd and FC Tiligul Tiraspol would have been promoted to the Top League for 1992.

The top six clubs of the league later entered European competitions for their respective nations. The Ukrainian clubs chose to qualify through a separate national competition.

Participating teams
The league was expanded to 16 after the last season, during which number of clubs left the Soviet competitions (from Georgia and Baltic states). The last-placed FC Rotor Volgograd of the 1990 Soviet Top League lost promotion/relegation playoff to Lokomotiv Moscow and was relegated to the 1991 Soviet First League. Rotor Volgograd returned to the Soviet First League after two seasons absence, while at the same time Lokomotiv Moscow returned to the Soviet Top League after only a one-season absence.

Beside the fourth placed Lokomotiv three more teams were promoted and included the champion (FC Spartak Vladikavkaz) and the runners-up of the 1990 Soviet First League (FC Pakhtakor Tashkent and FC Metalurh Zaporizhzhia).

 FC Spartak Vladikavkaz – champions (returning for the first time since 1970 after 20 seasons absence)
 FC Pakhtakor Tashkent – 2nd place (returning after six seasons)
 FC Metalurh Zaporizhzhia – 3rd place (debut)
 FC Lokomotiv Moscow – promotion play-off (returning after a season)

Locations

Stadiums

Final standings

 Immediately following this season, initially only Ukrainian-based teams officially informed the Football Federation of the Soviet Union about their withdrawal and participation in own national competitions. Just before organization of the next season, the Football Federation of the Soviet Union discovered that Armenian Ararat has no intentions to continue its participation either.

Results

Number of teams by union republic

Top scorers
18 goals
 Igor Kolyvanov (Dynamo Moscow)

14 goals
 Oleg Salenko (Dynamo Kyiv)
 Igor Shkvyrin (Pakhtakor)

13 goals
 Aleksandr Mostovoi (Spartak Moscow)
 Dmitri Radchenko (Spartak Moscow)
 Nazim Suleymanov (Spartak Vladikavkaz)

12 goals
 Dmitri Kuznetsov (CSKA Moscow)

10 goals
 Igor Korneev (CSKA Moscow)
 Andrei Piatnitski (Pakhtakor)

9 goals
 Andrei Kobelev (Dynamo Moscow)
 Viktor Leonenko (Dynamo Moscow)
 Oleg Sergeyev (CSKA Moscow)
 Valeri Velichko (Dinamo Minsk)

Clean sheets

14 matches
 Viktor Hryshko (Chornomorets Odesa)

11 matches
 Yuri Kurbyko (Dinamo Minsk)

10 matches
 Valeri Sarychev (Torpedo Moscow)
 Valeriy Horodov (Dnipro Dnipropetrovsk)
 Andriy Kovtun (Shakhtar Donetsk)

9 matches
 Stanislav Cherchesov (Spartak Moscow)
 Ihor Kutepov (Dynamo Kyiv)

8 matches
 Aleksandr Podshivalov (Torpedo Moscow)
 Andrei Manannikov (Pamir Dushanbe)

Managers

Awards

Medal squads
(league appearances and goals listed in brackets)

Managers and captains

See also
 1991 Soviet First League
 1991 Soviet Second League
 1991 Soviet Second League B
 1990–91 Soviet Cup
 1991–92 Soviet Cup

References

External links
  KLISF. Soviet Top League 1991.
 1991 Soviet Top League. FootballFacts.ru
 1991 season regulations. football.lg.ua
 «Спартак» мог стать последним чемпионом СССР вместо ЦСКА. Не хватило духа?. www.championat.com
 В последнем чемпионате СССР странные матчи играл даже чемпион. ЦСКА отличился в Киеве. www.championat.com
 «Садырин распахнул дверь: «Вы что, козлы, одурели?!». www.championat.com
 ЦСКА-1991. Последнее золото СССР. Как это было. www.championat.com
 Чемпионат СССР по футболу 1991. Развал страны – последний розыгрыш. dzen.ru

Soviet Top League seasons
1
Soviet
Soviet
1991 in Armenian football
1991 in Belarusian football
1991 in Russian football leagues
1991 in Tajikistani football
1991 in Ukrainian association football leagues
1991 in Uzbekistani football